Inner Mongolia Caoshangfei is a Chinese football club that currently participates in the China League Two division under licence from the Chinese Football Association (CFA). The team is based in Baotou and their home stadium is the 40,545 capacity Baotou Olympic Sports Centre Stadium.

History
On 5 May 1998 the club was established as a local amateur football team who took part in the regional Baotou leagues. They gradually worked their way up through the regional leagues until they were able to enter 2012 China Amateur Football League where they finished seventh. The local Baotou Municipal Sports Bureau would become interested supporting the team. By the 2014 league season they would financially invest into the team to take part in the 2014 Chinese FA Cup where they were knocked out in the first official round to Guizhou Zhicheng F.C. in a 3–1 home defeat. They continued to support the team and helped Baotou Nanjiao F.C. to officially establish themselves as a professional unit on 25 January 2015 to allow them to take part in the 2015 China League Two season.
Baotou Nanjiao F.C. changed their name to Inner Mongolia Caoshangfei F.C. in January 2019.

Name history
2015–2018 Baotou Nanjiao F.C. 包头南郊
2019– Inner Mongolia Caoshangfei F.C. 内蒙古草上飞

Players

Current squad

Coaching staff

Managerial history

  Yao Zhiqiang (2014)
  Xu Hui (2015)
  David Camhi (2016)
  Wang Hongwei (2017)
  Fan Wenlong (caretaker) (2017)
  Branko Božović （2017–）

Results
All-time league rankings

As of the end of 2019 season.

 in North Group.
 Chengdu Qbao and Shanghai JuJu Sports withdrew, so Baotou Nanjiao could stay at third level.

Key
 Pld = Played
 W = Games won
 D = Games drawn
 L = Games lost
 F = Goals for
 A = Goals against
 Pts = Points
 Pos = Final position

 DNQ = Did not qualify
 DNE = Did not enter
 NH = Not Held
 – = Does Not Exist
 R1 = Round 1
 R2 = Round 2
 R3 = Round 3
 R4 = Round 4

 F = Final
 SF = Semi-finals
 QF = Quarter-finals
 R16 = Round of 16
 Group = Group stage
 GS2 = Second Group stage
 QR1 = First Qualifying Round
 QR2 = Second Qualifying Round
 QR3 = Third Qualifying Round

References

Football clubs in China